Clear Lake is a mountain lake 86 mi (138 km) northeast of Eugene, Oregon, United States in Linn County. It has two main bodies connected by a bottleneck. The lake is primarily fed by snow runoff from nearby Mount Washington and the surrounding areas. The runoff filters through caverns for more than 20 years before emptying into Clear Lake. The lake is also fed by two small creeks, which may dry up seasonally, along with Great Spring, the source of the McKenzie River.

Clear Lake is the headwaters of the McKenzie River, which is the sole source of drinking water for Eugene.

Diving
Clear Lake is reported to be one of the most exceptional freshwater dive spots in Oregon.
The trees are remarkably preserved due to the cold year-round water temperatures of between 35–43 °F (1.6–6 °C).

Hiking
An accompanying trail guide prepared by Willamette National Forest tells visitors about Clear Lake and the neighboring lava field and forest.

See also
 List of lakes in Oregon

References

External links

Lakes of Oregon
Lakes of Linn County, Oregon
Willamette National Forest
Protected areas of Linn County, Oregon